Urswick School may refer to:

 The Urswick School, a secondary school in Hackney, London, England
 Urswick Grammar School, a defunct school in Little Urswick, Cumbria, England